Kidd's Mills Covered Bridge Historic District is a national historic district located at Pymatuning Township, Mercer County, Pennsylvania.  The district includes two contributing sites and one contributing structure. The Kidd's Mills Covered Bridge is a historic wooden covered bridge built in 1868. It is rare example of a Smith Cross Truss bridge in the eastern United States. The district includes the sites of two grist mills.

It was added to the National Register of Historic Places in 1974.

See also
List of bridges documented by the Historic American Engineering Record in Pennsylvania

References

External links

Historic American Engineering Record (HAER) documentation:
HAER No. PA-622, "Kidd's Mill Bridge"
HAER No. PA-645, "Structural Study of Smith Trusses"

Covered bridges on the National Register of Historic Places in Pennsylvania
Historic American Engineering Record in Pennsylvania
Historic districts on the National Register of Historic Places in Pennsylvania
Covered bridges in Mercer County, Pennsylvania
Bridges completed in 1868
Bridges in Mercer County, Pennsylvania
National Register of Historic Places in Mercer County, Pennsylvania
Road bridges on the National Register of Historic Places in Pennsylvania
Wooden bridges in Pennsylvania
Truss bridges in the United States